George E. Smith is an American scientist, applied physicist and Nobel Prize winner.

George E. Smith may also refer to:
 George E. Smith (footballer), English footballer
 George E. Smith (gambler), American gambler and horse racing enthusiast
 George Edwin Smith (1849–1919), Massachusetts lawyer, legal writer, and politician
 George Edward Smith (born 1940), POW in Vietnam for two years, released in 1965
 George Smith (sportsman), baseball and basketball player
 G. E. Smith (George Edward Smith), American guitarist

See also
 George Smith (disambiguation)